Naticornus is a genus of flies in the family Dolichopodidae. It is known from Laos, and contains only one species, Naticornus luteum.

References

Dolichopodidae genera
Neurigoninae
Diptera of Asia
Monotypic Diptera genera
Endemic fauna of Laos
Insects of Laos